The Kaohsiung Film Festival (KFF) is a film festival held  annually in Kaohsiung City, Taiwan. Established in 2001, the festival screens both locally produced and international films, in all genres and lengths. The festival also has an international competition section where it hands out awards for outstanding short films.

References

External links
 
 

Film festivals in Taiwan
Film festivals established in 2001
2001 establishments in Taiwan